Andrew Ntim Manu (born 29 July 2000) is a Ghanaian footballer who currently plays as a midfielder for Ghana Premier League side WAFA.

Career 
Manu started his career with West African Football Academy. He was promoted to the senior team in August 2018. On 31 March 2019, he made his debut during match day 1 of the 2019 GFA Normalization Committee Competition. He played the full 90 minutes and scored third goal in a 3–1 victory over Liberty Professionals. At the end of the match, he was adjudged the man of the match. At the end of the competition, he made 8 league appearances and scored a goal. He made 14 league appearances and scored a goal during both the truncated 2019–20 season (cancelled due to the COVID-19 pandemic in Ghana) and 2020–21 season.

References

External links 

 

Living people
2000 births
Association football midfielders
Ghanaian footballers
West African Football Academy players
Ghana Premier League players